Stade de Dosso is a multi-use stadium in Dosso, Niger. It is currently used mostly for football matches and serves as the home venue for Entente FC.  The stadium holds 7,000 people.

References 

Football venues in Niger